The 1972–73 DDR-Oberliga was the 24th season of the DDR-Oberliga, the first tier of league football in East Germany.

The league was contested by fourteen teams. Dynamo Dresden won the championship, the club's third of eight East German championships.

Hans-Jürgen Kreische of Dynamo Dresden was the league's top scorer with 26 goals, the third of a record four top scorer finishes for Kreische, with him also winning the seasons East German Footballer of the year award.

On the strength of the 1972–73 title Dresden qualified for the 1973–74 European Cup where the club was knocked out by Bundesliga champions FC Bayern Munich in the second round. It was the first time the East and West German champions were drawn against each other in an UEFA competition and resulted in a close contest, Bayern winning 7–6 on aggregate. Third-placed club 1. FC Magdeburg qualified for the 1973–74 European Cup Winners' Cup as the seasons FDGB-Pokal winners and won the competition after a 2–0 final victory over AC Milan, the greatest success of any East German club in Europe. Second-placed FC Carl Zeiss Jena qualified for the 1973–74 UEFA Cup where it was knocked out in the second round by Ruch Chorzów while fourth-placed 1. FC Lokomotive Leipzig lost to Tottenham Hotspur in the semi-finals, having previously overcome Fortuna Düsseldorf in the third round in another German East-West encounter.

Table									
The 1972–73 season saw two newly promoted clubs BSG Chemie Leipzig and FC Rot-Weiss Erfurt.

Results

References

Sources

External links
 Das Deutsche Fussball Archiv  Historic German league tables

1
1972-73
Ober